Scrambled Wives is a lost 1921 American silent comedy film produced by and starring Marguerite Clark. It was directed by Edward H. Griffith and released through Associated First National. This film had one color sequence, presumably a 1-strip Technicolor process being that Technicolor's Ray June is one of the cameramen. This film marks Clark's final screen performance. It is not known whether the film currently survives. 
This film is based on the play The First Mrs. Chiverick by Adelaide Matthews.

Plot
Based on a description in a film publication, Mary Smith (Clark) gives a party in her college room when John Chiverick (Bunker) is found in attendance. Because he has "compromised" her, John feels obligated to marry Mary. Immediately after the ceremony, Mary's father (Washburn) has the marriage annulled and sends Mary abroad. After two years she returns and sees her former husband at a Long Island house party. There is much concern about the disgrace that would be caused if her marriage annulment were to become public knowledge. Larry McCleod (Gendron) is at the party and is in love with Mary, although he believes that she is a widow. She accepts his proposal after confessing her situation.

Cast
Marguerite Clark as Miss Mary Lucille Smith
Pierre Gendron as Larry McCleod
Ralph Bunker as John Chiverick
Florence Martin as Bessie
Virginia Lee as Beatrice Lee
Alice Mann as Connie Chiverick
Frank Badgley as Dickie Van Arsdale
America Chedister as Mrs. Halsey
John Mayer as Mr. Halsey
John Washburn as Mr. Smith
Thomas Braidon as The Butler
Ada Neville as Mrs. Spencer
Emma Wilcox as Dot

Sightings 
In the public area of the Metro Bank in Guildford there is an enlarged photograph dating from 1923 can be seen of Guildford High Street. The photograph measures approx. 20 ft x 10 ft. On the right of the photo Scrambled Wives, can be seen advertised at the front of a playhouse (that has since been demolished).

References

External links

lobby poster

1921 films
American silent feature films
Lost American films
American films based on plays
Films directed by Edward H. Griffith
1921 comedy films
Silent American comedy films
First National Pictures films
American black-and-white films
1921 lost films
Lost comedy films
1920s American films